McKinnon's Pond is a lake just north of St. John's, Antigua and Barbuda, the capital of its country. Runaway Beach is just west of it, and it is fed by a small stream leading from St. John's.

McKinnon's Pond is located in the city of McKinnon's.

References

Bodies of water of Antigua and Barbuda